Bumiputera or Bumiputra (Jawi: , Native) is a term used in Malaysia to describe Malays, the Orang Asli of Peninsular Malaysia, and various indigenous peoples of East Malaysia (see official definition below). The term is sometimes controversial, and has similar usage in the Malay world, used similarly in Indonesia and Brunei.

The term is derived from the Sanskrit which was later absorbed into the classical Malay word , which can be translated literally as "son of the land" or "son of the soil". In Indonesia, this term is known as "Pribumi".

In the 1970s, the Malaysian government implemented policies designed to favour bumiputras (including affirmative action in public education and in the public sector) to elevate the socioeconomic status of the economically disadvantaged bumiputera community and to defuse interethnic tensions following the 13 May Incident in 1969 by placating the Malay majority through granting them a privileged status over the Malaysian Chinese. Originally intended to be a temporary measure, these policies are still in effect and have been described as racially discriminatory. Although the policies have succeeded in creating a significant urban Malay and Native Bornean middle class, they have been less effective in eradicating poverty among rural communities.

Official definition

The concept of a bumiputra ethnic group in Malaysia was coined by Abdul Razak Hussein. It recognised the "special position" of the Malays provided in the Constitution of Malaysia, in particular Article 153. However, the constitution does not use the term bumiputra; it defines only "Malay" and "aboriginal peoples" (Article 160(2)), "natives" of Sarawak (161A(6)(a)), and "natives" of Sabah (Article 161A(6) (b)). Definitions of bumiputra in public use vary among different institutions, organisations, and government departments and agencies.

In the book Buku Panduan Kemasukan ke Institusi Pengajian Tinggi Awam, Program Pengajian Lepasan SPM/Setaraf Sesi Akademik 2007/2008 (Guidebook for entry into public higher learning institutions for SPM/equivalent graduates for academic year 2007/2008), the Malaysian Higher Education Ministry defined bumiputra as follows, depending on the region of origin of the individual applicant:

 Peninsular Malaysia
 "If one of the parents is Muslim Malay/Orang Asli as stated in Article 160 (2) Federal Constitution of Malaysia; thus the child is considered as a Bumiputra"
 Sabah
 "If the child was born in Sabah or the father was domiciled in Sabah at the time of birth, and one of the parents is an indigenous native of Sabah as stated in Article 161A (6)(b) Federal Constitution of Malaysia, the child is considered as a Bumiputra"
 Sarawak
 "If both of the parents are indigenous natives of Sarawak as stated in Article 161A (6)(a) Federal Constitution of Malaysia; thus their child is considered as a Bumiputra"

In addition to the interpretation given above, a broader definition of bumiputra include groups such as native Indonesians, Malaysian Siamese, Muslim Indian Malaysians, Peranakan and the Kristang people of Portuguese-Eurasian descent. Most of these encompass communities that were established in southeast Asia prior to the period of British colonial rule which saw large-scale immigration from China. Others favour a definition encompassing all children of Bumiputra; there have been notable cases of people with one Bumiputra parent and one non-Bumiputra parent being dismissed as non-Bumiputra.

History
At the time of Malaya's independence from British colonial rule in 1957, the population included many first- or second-generation immigrants who had come to fill manpower needs as indentured labourers, among rich Chinese merchants and settlers who brought their wealth and investment into Malaysia.

Chinese immigrants, who typically settled in urban areas, played a significant role in the commercial sector after the Indians left the country to return to India, much of the commercial sector was taken over by wealthy Chinese merchants. The Communities Liaison Committee (CLC), comprising leading politicians from different racial backgrounds, supported the promotion of economic equality for the Malays, conditional on political equality for the non-Malays. CLC member E.E.C. Thuraisingham later said, "I and others believed that the backward Malays should be given a better deal. Malays should be assisted to attain parity with non-Malays to forge a united Malayan Nation of equals."

Article 153 of the Constitution states that,

Article 160 defines a Malay as being one who "professes the religion of Islam, habitually speaks the Malay language, conforms to Malay customs and is the child of at least one parent who was born within the Federation of Malaysia before independence of Malaya on 31 August 1957, or the issue of such a person."

Article 8 of the Constitution, states that all Malaysian citizens shall be equal under the law, and "Except as expressly authorised by this Constitution, there shall be no discrimination against citizens on the ground only of religion, race, descent or place of birth in any law or in the appointment to any office or employment under a public authority or in the administration of any law relating to the acquisition, holding or disposition of property or the establishing or carrying on of any trade, business, profession, vocation or employment." Article 153 itself expressly forbids particular forms of discrimination; clause 5 states that "All persons of whatever race in the same grade in the service of the Federation shall, subject to the terms and conditions of their employment, be treated impartially," while clause 9 states: "Nothing in this Article shall empower Parliament to restrict business or trade solely for the purpose of reservations for Malays."

The term of the Bumiputras' special position has been disputed. The Reid Commission, which drafted the Constitution, initially proposed that Article 153 expire after 15 years unless renewed by Parliament. This qualification was struck from the final draft. After the 13 May Incident in 1969, representatives within the government argued over whether the special position of the bumiputras ought to have a sunset clause.

Ismail Abdul Rahman argued that "the question be left to the Malays themselves because ... as more and more Malays became educated and gained self-confidence, they themselves would do away with this 'special position'." Ismail believed the special position was "a slur on the ability of the Malays." In 1970, however, one member of the Cabinet said that Malay special rights would remain for "hundreds of years to come."

In the 1970s, the government implemented the New Economic Policy (NEP), designed to be a more aggressive form of affirmative action for the Bumiputra than Article 153. Article 153 provides specifically for the use of quotas in the granting of scholarships, positions in the civil service, and business licences, as well as native reservations of land. Policies under the rubric of the NEP include subsidies for real estate purchases, quotas for public equity shares, and general subsidies to Bumiputra businesses.

Former Prime Minister Abdullah Ahmad Badawi and his predecessor Dr. Mahathir bin Mohamad have both suggested that Malays should depend less on government assistance. Many observers believe full abolition of bumiputra privileges is unlikely, especially in view of the constitutional issues involved, although successive administrations since Mahathir have attempted to reform the system of government aid for the bumiputra. Some bumiputra groups believe further affirmative action is necessary.

Parliament began to use the term bumiputra in 1965. Following debate of the act to create the Majlis Amanah Rakyat (MARA), the government founded an agency to preserve bumiputra interests.

In July 2017, Prime Minister Najib Razak said that the government would consider the request of the Muslim Indian community to be recognized as Bumiputera, in what is seen as a move to woo voters in the lead-up to the upcoming general election.

Contentious policy

Certain but not all pro-bumiputra policies exist as affirmative action for bumiputras, for NEP is racial-based and not deprivation-based. For instance, all Bumiputra, regardless of their financial standing, are entitled 7 percent discount on houses or property, including luxurious units; whilst a low-income non-Bumiputra receives no such financial assistance. Other preferential policies include quotas for the following: admission to government educational institutions, qualification for public scholarships, marking of universities exam papers, special bumiputras-only classes prior to university's end of term exams, for positions in government, and ownership of businesses. Most of the policies were established in the Malaysian New Economic Policy (NEP) period. Many policies focus on trying to achieve a bumiputra share of corporate equity, comprising at least 30% of the total. Ismail Abdul Rahman proposed this target after the government was unable to agree on a suitable policy goal.

In a report titled 2012 Investment Climate Statement – Malaysia published by the Bureau of Economic and Business Affairs (US Department of State), under the heading "Ethnic Preferences", part of a paragraph succinctly describes the reality of such Bumiputra policy as follows:"Many of the preference policies are opaque, with details of implementation largely left to the various ministries and civil servants within those ministries. Policies and practices vary greatly. Some practices are explicit and contained in law or regulation, while others are informal, leaving much ambiguity for potential investors. The civil service itself is subject to Bumiputra hiring preferences. The NEM [New Economic Model] proposes reforming ethnic preferences in business ownership and social safety net programs. Some conservative Bumiputra groups have voiced strong opposition to any significant changes to the extensive preferences."

Examples of such policies include:
 Companies listed on the Kuala Lumpur Stock Exchange (Bursa Saham Kuala Lumpur) used to adhere to a 30% bumiputra ownership of equity to satisfy listing requirements. Foreign companies that operate in Malaysia also must adhere to this requirement. This policy was canceled in 2009.
 For a limited period, a certain percentage of new housing in any development has to be sold to bumiputra owners. Housing developers are required to provide a minimum 7% discount to bumiputra buyers of these lots. This is required regardless of the income level of the potential buyer. Remaining unsold houses after a given time period are allowed to be sold to non-bumiputera if the developer proves attempts have been made to fulfil the requirement. There is no bumiputra discount on existing housing.
 A basket of government-run (and profit-guaranteed) mutual funds are available for purchase by bumiputra buyers only. The Amanah Saham Nasional (ASN) has return rates approximately 3 to 5 times that of local commercial banks.
 Many government-tendered projects require that companies submitting tenders be bumiputra owned. This requirement has led to non-bumiputras teaming up with bumiputra companies to obtain projects, in a practice known as "Ali Baba". Ali, the bumiputra, is included solely to satisfy this requirement, and Baba (the non-bumiputra) pays Ali a certain sum in exchange.
 Projects were earmarked for bumiputra contractors to enable them to gain expertise in various fields.
 Approved Permits (APs) for automobiles preferentially allow bumiputra to import vehicles. Automotive companies wishing to bring in cars need to have an AP to do so. APs were originally created to allow bumiputra participation in the automotive industry, since they were issued to companies with at least 70% bumiputra ownership. In 2004, The Edge (a business newspaper) estimated that APs were worth approximately RM 35,000 each. They also estimated that the late Nasimuddin Amin, the former chairman of the Naza group, received 6,387 in 2003, making him the largest single recipient of APs. More than 12,200 APs were issued in 2003. In addition to APs, foreign car marquees are required to pay between 140% to 300% import duty.

As a result of these policies, many bumiputera with good connections quickly became millionaires. According to Tan Sri Rafidah Aziz, former Minister of Trade and Industry, the policy was to create "Towering Malays". In 2005 she gave a speech that stated: "If there are young Malay entrepreneurs whose companies are successful, then we appreciate their success, we want Towering Malays of glokal (global and local) standard". She also said that the policy of Approved Permits (APs) had produced many bumiputera entrepreneurs in the automotive industry.

Since 2000, the Government has discussed phasing out certain affirmative action programs and reinstating "meritocracy". In 2003 it began the system of "Malaysian model meritocracy" for university admission. Admission to public universities was not based upon a common examination such as the SAT or A-Levels, but rather upon a two parallel systems of either a one-year matriculation course or a two-year STPM (Malaysian Higher School Certificate) programme. Bumiputras compose an overwhelming majority of entrants to the matriculation programme. It is a commonly-held belief that the public university entry requirements are easier for matriculation students and disproportionately difficult for STPM students.

Quotas also exist for Public Services Department (JPA) scholarships, full scholarships offered to students to study in leading universities worldwide. These scholarships are given on the basis of SPM (Sijil Pelajaran Malaysia, the equivalent of O-Levels) results, ethnic group, and certain quotas. The JPA scholars are sent to selected pre-university programmes offered by the government – from there, they apply to universities.

Opposition to the Bumiputera policy

Early opposition
In the 1965 session of Parliament, Singapore's Prime Minister Lee Kuan Yew (who was also a Member of that Parliament) questioned the implementation of Malay rights as proposed. Lee asked, "How does the Malay in the kampung find his way out into this modernised civil society? By becoming servants of the 0.3 per cent who would have the money to hire them to clean their shoe, open their motorcar doors?" and "How does telling a Malay bus driver that he should support the party of his Malay director (UMNO) and the Chinese bus conductor to join another party of his Chinese director (MCA) – how does that improve the standards of the Malay bus driver and the Chinese bus conductor who are both workers in the same company?"

Lee closed with "Meanwhile, whenever there is a failure of economic, social and educational policies, you come back and say, oh, these wicked Chinese, Indian and others opposing Malay rights. They don't oppose Malay rights. They, the Malay, have the right as Malaysian citizens to go up to the level of training and education that the more competitive societies, the non-Malay society, has produced. That is what must be done, isn't it? Not to feed them with this obscurantist doctrine that all they have got to do is to get Malay rights for the few special Malays and their problem has been resolved."

Policy apologists and ongoing opposition
At the 2004 annual general assembly of the United Malays National Organisation, which is the largest member of the governing coalition, deputy chair Badruddin Amiruldin cautioned against questioning the Bumiputras' special rights, which met with approval from the delegates: "Let no one from the other races ever question the rights of Malays on this land. Don't question the religion because this is my right on this land." In 2004, Mohd. Johari Baharum, parliamentary secretary of the Prime Minister's Department, stated that the PSD scholarships would remain quota based. He added that there were no plans to convert this to a merit based system, and that the total value of the PSD scholarship since 1996 was 2.4 billion Ringgit.

Another controversial aspect is that the Orang Asli of peninsular Malaysia are not considered Bumiputra under the Federal constitution. As their settlement predates that of the Malays, this is considered by many, that Bumiputra is about the promotion one religion over another, especially since Orang Asli are much worse off than Muslim Malays. Others argue that the Orang Asli are in fact considered Bumiputra.

On 1 March 2009, Datuk Nik Aziz Nik Mat, the spiritual leader of the opposition Pan-Malaysian Islamic Party stated that the term bumiputera is racist and the policy prevented other races from receiving government aid. Nik Aziz's remarks were made in response to the criticisms and threats made by UMNO against Democratic Action Party's Boo Cheng Hau, the opposition leader in Johor when Boo was reported to have compared "bumiputeraism" with state apartheid.

On 1 February 2015, Swiss academic Tariq Ramadan reflected on how non-Muslims have been treated as second class citizens. He stated, "I'm sorry but some of your fellow citizens in this country who are not Muslims are facing this discrimination, they are facing injustices."

Present condition of the Bumiputra
In 2006, the then Minister of Higher Education, Mustapa Mohamad, stated that he wanted public universities to recruit more non-bumiputra academic staff to "strive for world-class institutions", which may have signaled a move toward less racial discrimination in academia. However this does not affect entry into universities, which is still designed to restrict other races access to higher education in favour of the bumiputra.

The manufacturing sector is exempted from the Foreign Investment Committee (FIC) Guidelines and the mandatory 30% Bumiputera equity and restrictions in market entry have been removed for all (manufacturing) sub-sectors.

National identification card system and Bumiputera
Malaysia requires citizens to carry a national identification card called MyKad. Smart Cards identify citizens as Muslims or Non-Muslims. the National identification card does not specify whether or not the holder is a bumiputera.

See also

Bumiputera (Brunei)
Bumiputera (Indonesia)
Ketuanan Melayu
Social contract (Malaysia)
Malayness
Human rights in Malaysia

Notes and references

External links
  Indian Community Victim of ‘Bumiputera’ Policy, Observer Research Foundation, By Dilip Lahiri, February 2008
 The “Allah” case in Malaysia, World Press, By Dr Marranci, 18 January 2010
  2012 Investment Climate Statement – Malaysia, By BUREAU OF ECONOMIC AND BUSINESS AFFAIRS, U.S. Department of State, June 2012

Ethnic groups in Malaysia
Politics and race
Racial and religious quotas in Malaysia
Ethnology
Discrimination in Malaysia
Indigenous peoples of Southeast Asia
Malay people